The 1997 LSU Tigers football team represented Louisiana State University in the 1997 NCAA Division I-A football season.  Coached by Gerry DiNardo in his third season at LSU, the Tigers played their home games at Tiger Stadium in Baton Rouge, Louisiana.

The Tigers began the season with high expectations following their first 10-win season since 1987. LSU's season was highlighted by a stunning 28–21 home upset of the top ranked Florida Gators (ending Florida's 25-game winning streak in SEC play) and an Independence Bowl victory over the Notre Dame Fighting Irish, who had defeated the Tigers in Baton Rouge during the regular season.

LSU also shut out Alabama 27–0 at Tuscaloosa, paying back the Crimson Tide for a 26–0 loss the previous season in Baton Rouge.

Despite the highs, LSU also experienced two embarrassing home losses. The first was to Ole Miss one week after the Tigers' conquest of then-No. 1 Florida. The second was to Notre Dame, which came to Baton Rouge at 4–5, needing three consecutive victories just to qualify for a bowl. In a stunning 24–6 triumph, the Irish rushed for 232 yards and played their first penalty-free and turnover-free game in program history.

LSU was also quite fortunate to escape with a 7–6 victory at Vanderbilt, DiNardo's former employer. The Commodores scored a late touchdown and were lined up to go for a two-point conversion and a potential 8–7 win, but two delay of game penalties convinced Vanderbilt coach Woody Widenhofer to instead play for overtime. LSU's Arnold Miller preserved the win by blocking the kick.

The Tigers tied for the SEC West title for the second straight year, but Auburn had won a dramatic game in Baton Rouge earlier in the season and therefore represented the West in the SEC Championship.

Schedule

References

LSU
LSU Tigers football seasons
Independence Bowl champion seasons
LSU Tigers football